Freddy Eusebio Rincón Valencia (14 August 1966 – 13 April 2022) was a Colombian professional footballer who played 84 games for the Colombia national team between 1990 and 2001. A versatile midfielder, he was capable of playing on the left, in the centre or as an attacking midfielder. At club level he played for Independiente Santa Fé, América de Cali (Colombia), Napoli (Italy), Real Madrid (Spain), Palmeiras, Santos, and Corinthians (Brazil).

Club career
Rincón began his professional career at Independiente Santa Fé in 1986, winning the Copa Colombia in 1989 with the capital club, as well as gaining national acclaim for his performances.

With América de Cali he won the Colombian Championship in 1990 and 1992.

It was his performances at the 1994 World Cup that prompted Parma to sign the Colombian midfielder. However the three foreigner rule meant he was loaned out to Napoli, and was eventually sold onto Real Madrid for the 1995-96 season.

Rincón spent the latter part of his career playing club football in Brazil where he played for Palmeiras, Corinthians, Santos and Cruzeiro. During his time with Corinthians the club won the Brazilian championship in 1998 and 1999 and the first FIFA Club World Cup in 2000, his greatest title.

International career

Rincón scored 17 goals in 84 caps for the Colombia national team, playing in the 1990, 1994, and 1998 World Cups.

His most memorable goal is the one he scored against West Germany in Milan, Italy on 19 June during the 1990 World Cup. Playing into injury time, Colombia needed a goal to draw the game and avoid elimination from the tournament at the group stages. When played through by a pass from  Carlos Valderrama, Rincon held his nerve and calmly fired the ball through the legs of Bodo Illgner to secure the draw his team needed. During a qualifying match for the 1994 FIFA World Cup on 5 September 1993 against Argentina, he scored the first goal of the game receiving the ball from teammate Carlos Valderrama and passing the Argentine goalkeeper, Sergio Goycochea, before scoring the third goal in a 5–0 victory that secured Colombia's place at the World Cup.

Coaching career
In 2005, Rincón started a football manager career, after he was hired as Iraty manager for the 2006 season. On 27 September 2006, Rincón was hired as São Bento's manager. He was the coach of São José Esporte Clube of São José dos Campos, São Paulo.

He was hired as Corinthians youth team head coach in 2009.

Personal life
Rincón had been a member of the Church of Jesus Christ of Latter-day Saints since 20 August 2005. He was baptized in São Paulo Perdizes Stake in Brazil.

In 2007, Rincón came under criminal investigation in Colombia and Panama, facing charges of collaboration with cocaine kingpin Pablo Rayo Montaño and suspicion of money laundering. On 10 May, São Paulo police took him into custody after a Panamanian request for extradition. In August 2013, Rincón suffered multiple injuries in a car accident in his native Valle del Cauca, where he underwent surgery at a local hospital.

Rincón's son is professional footballer Sebastián Rincón, who currently plays for Barracas Central in Argentina.

Death
On 11 April 2022, Rincón was hospitalized with critical head injuries after the car he was driving collided with a bus in the Colombian city of Cali. Four of his passengers and the bus driver were also injured. He died two days later.

Career statistics
Scores and results list Colombia's goal tally first, score column indicates score after each Rincón goal.

Honours

Independiente Santa Fe
Copa Colombia: 1989

América de Cali
Categoría Primera A: 1990, 1992

Palmeiras
Campeonato Brasileiro Série A: 1994
Campeonato Paulista: 1994

Corinthians
Brasileirão: 1998, 1999
Campeonato Paulista: 1999
FIFA Club World Cup: 2000

Colombia
Copa América third place: 1993, 1995

Individual
Bola de Prata: 1999

References

External links

International statistics at rsssf
Futbol Factory profile 
What happened to Freddy Rincon? at Realmadridnews.com

1966 births
2022 deaths
People from Buenaventura, Valle del Cauca
Converts to Mormonism
Colombian Latter Day Saints
Colombian footballers
Association football midfielders
Colombia international footballers
Categoría Primera A players
Campeonato Brasileiro Série A players
La Liga players
Serie A players
1990 FIFA World Cup players
1994 FIFA World Cup players
1998 FIFA World Cup players
1991 Copa América players
1993 Copa América players
1995 Copa América players
Colombian football managers
Independiente Santa Fe footballers
América de Cali footballers
Sociedade Esportiva Palmeiras players
S.S.C. Napoli players
Real Madrid CF players
Sport Club Corinthians Paulista players
Santos FC players
Cruzeiro Esporte Clube players
Iraty Sport Club managers
Esporte Clube São Bento managers
São José Esporte Clube managers
Colombian people of African descent
Colombian expatriate footballers
Colombian expatriate sportspeople in Brazil
Expatriate footballers in Brazil
Colombian expatriate sportspeople in Italy
Expatriate footballers in Italy
Colombian expatriate sportspeople in Spain
Expatriate footballers in Spain
Road incident deaths in Colombia
Sportspeople from Valle del Cauca Department